Three ships of the Royal Navy have borne the name HMS St Mary or HMS St Marys:

  was a cog in service with the Cinque Ports in 1299.
  was a ship purchased in 1626 and given away in 1628.
She was transferred to the Royal Navy in 1940 and was sold for scrapping in 1945.

See also
 

Royal Navy ship names